Three referendums were held in Liechtenstein during 1985. The first was held on 3 February on a new hunting law, and was rejected by 62.5% of voters. The second was held on 2 July on increasing the number of seats in the Landtag and had two proposals. Neither gained a majority of votes, so both were rejected. The third was held on 1 December on sexual equality. It also had two options, but both failed to gain a majority and were rejected.

Results

New hunting law

Increased number of Landtag members

Sexual equality

References

1985 referendums
1985 in Liechtenstein
Referendums in Liechtenstein
Women's rights in Liechtenstein
Hunting referendums